Kronos, also spelled as Chronos, is a fictional character appearing in American comic books published by Marvel Comics. The character first appears in Iron Man #55 (Feb. 1973) and was created by Jim Starlin.

Publication history
Kronos first appears in the title Iron Man, saving the soul of Arthur Douglas, killed by a barrage from the ship of the Titan, Thanos. Kronos subsequently uses Douglas' soul to create Drax the Destroyer, a being intended to kill Thanos, his own grandson. A back-up story in the alternate universe title What If reveals in flashback that many millennia ago the character was originally one of the immortal Eternals, and led a rebellion against his tyrannical brother Uranos. After a successful coup, Kronos fathered the Eternals Zuras and A'lars (also known as Mentor, the present leader of the Titanian Eternals), before being accidentally atomized during a botched experiment. The character's spirit survives, continuing to exist in astral form with amplified powers and abilities.

In the title Captain Marvel, Thanos comes into possession of the artifact the Cosmic Cube and uses it to imprison Kronos, who is eventually freed when Thanos is defeated by the Kree hero Mar-Vell and the superhero team the Avengers. In the third volume of the title Silver Surfer, Kronos realizes that the entity Death has restored Thanos to life, and, in response, the character restores an at-the-time deceased Drax to life, to hunt Thanos once again (with an increase in physical power at the cost of his mental acuity). Kronos features briefly in the title Quasar, encountering the disembodied spirit of villain Maelstrom, and glimpses Infinity when the entity manifests.

The character features in the limited series the Infinity Gauntlet, and with the combined cosmic pantheon of the Marvel universe attempt to stop Thanos, who at the time wields the Infinity Gems. In the title Warlock and the Infinity Watch Kronos listens to the entreaties of the heroine Moondragon, and restores Drax - her father when Arthur Douglas - to his original, thinking state.

Powers and abilities
Kronos was originally one of the Earth Eternals. Due to an explosion caused by an experiment gone wrong, he lost his physical form.  The energy from that same explosion resulted in other Eternals of Earth becoming immortal and gaining cosmic powers.  Once an abstract being, Kronos became a time entity with the ability to achieve virtually any effect by willing it. He occasionally manifests as a huge transparent humanoid so lesser beings can perceive him.

Reception
 In 2021, CBR.com ranked Kronos 1st in their "15 Most Powerful Eternals" list.
 In 2021, Screen Rant ranked Kronos 1st in their "10 Most Powerful Members Of The Eternals" list

References

External links
Kronos at Marvel.com

Characters created by Jim Starlin
Comics characters introduced in 1973
Eternals (comics)
Fictional characters who can manipulate time
Fictional characters with immortality

it:Kronos (personaggio)